Amtrak offers three passenger train routes through Ohio, serving the major cities of Toledo, Cleveland, and Cincinnati.

The major cities of Columbus, Akron and Dayton do not have Amtrak service. Columbus is the second largest metropolitan area in the U.S. without passenger rail service. Columbus last had service with the National Limited in 1979. Dayton (which lost service in 1979 with the termination of the National Limited) and Akron (which lost service in 2005 with the termination of the Three Rivers) are the eleventh and twelfth.

Of the cities in Ohio, only Greater Cleveland has rail mass transit, with rail stations within or "across the road" from the following communities:
 Beachwood (Blue and Green Lines end near Beachwood)
 Brook Park (across from Airport and Brook Park stations)
 Cleveland
 Cleveland Heights (couple blocks from Cedar–University, Coventry–Shaker, and Shaker Square stations)
 East Cleveland (Red Line ends at the Louis Stokes Station at Windermere)
 Lakewood (across from Madison–W.117 and Triskett–West 140th. stations)
 Shaker Heights (Blue and Green Lines)

Cleveland had a subway line crossing the Cuyahoga River on the lower-deck of Detroit-Superior Bridge traveling between Ohio City (near Detroit and West 25th. St.) and downtown Cleveland.  Currently, it is open only for historical walking tours. Cleveland still has one subway line today, the Red Line, running from Cleveland-Hopkins International Airport to Louis Stokes-Windermere via Tower City-Public Square where it connects with the other lines, which are light rail.
Cleveland also had a much larger, electric-powered light-rail streetcar system of rail coaches and overhead lines, which were replaced by diesel-powered city transit buses.

Cincinnati once started construction of a subway, but work was abandoned during the Great Depression. Cincinnati has had efforts in the 21st century to revive train service with plans to extend train service from the Cincinnati Airport (CVG) in Kentucky to downtown Cincinnati, to Kings Island. However, funding for this project has not been found.

There are also several passenger railroad lines and train stations in Ohio which offer scenic train rides.

Amtrak service

Cardinal (Chicago – Cincinnati – Washington DC – New York)
 Cincinnati: Cincinnati Union Terminal (CIN)

The Cardinal enters Ohio near College Corner, travels through Hamilton, and stops at Cincinnati Union Terminal. After leaving Cincinnati, the train crosses into Kentucky, where it follows the Ohio River on the southern border of Ohio to Ashland, Kentucky.

The Kentucky and West Virginia stations of Maysville, South Shore–South Portsmouth, Ashland, and Huntington are on Ohio's state border; the South Portsmouth–South Shore station primarily serves Portsmouth, Ohio.

Capitol Limited (Chicago – Cleveland – Pittsburgh – Washington DC)

 Toledo: Martin Luther King Jr. Plaza (TOL)
 Sandusky: Sandusky station (SKY)
 Elyria: Elyria station (ELY)
 Cleveland: Cleveland Lakefront Station (CLE)
 Alliance: Alliance station (ALC)

Lake Shore Limited (Chicago – Cleveland – Albany – Boston/New York City)
 Bryan: Bryan station (BYN)
 Toledo: Martin Luther King Jr. Plaza (TOL)
 Sandusky: Sandusky station (SKY)
 Elyria: Elyria station (ELY)
 Cleveland: Cleveland Lakefront Station (CLE)

Rail mass transit

Cleveland, Ohio has two standard gauge RTA Rapid Transit rail systems, one for heavy-rail and one for three light-rail lines:

Scenic trains
 Ashtabula, Carson & Jefferson Scenic Railroad – Jefferson, Ohio
 Jefferson
 Buckeye Central Scenic Railroad – Hebron, Ohio (defunct; see ZWSR)
 Byesville Scenic Railway – Byesville, Ohio
 Byesville Station
 N Cabin (C&M Crossing)
 Cedar Point & Lake Erie Railroad – Sandusky, Ohio
 Main Station (Funway Station)
 Frontier Town Station
 Boneville Station
 Connotton Valley Railway – Bedford, Ohio
 Bedford Depot
 Cuyahoga Valley Scenic Railroad – Peninsula, Ohio
 Rockside Station
 Canal Visitor Center
 Brecksville Station
 Boston Mill Station
 Peninsula Depot
 Indigo Lake
 Botzum (Indian Mound) Station
 Akron Northside Station
 Howe Meadow
 Canton Lincoln Highway Station
 Hocking Valley Scenic Railway – Nelsonville, Ohio
 Nelsonville Depot
 Haydenville
 Robbins Crossing
 Logan
 Lebanon Mason Monroe Railroad – Lebanon, Ohio
 Lebanon Station
 Southwest Golf Ranch
 Schappacher Farms
 Lorain & West Virginia Railway – Wellington, Ohio
 Minerva Scenic Railway - Minerva, Ohio
 Minerva
 Toledo, Lake Erie and Western Railway – Waterville, Ohio
 Waterville Station

 Zanesville & Western Scenic Railroad – Fultonham, Ohio (former Buckeye Central Scenic Railroad & Glass Rock Line)

See also
 Railroad terminals of Cleveland, Ohio
 List of railway stations
 Union Station (disambiguation)

References

External links

 Cleveland RTA Commuter trains
 Proposed commuter rail for Cincinnati
 Ohio Railway Museum

Transportation in Ohio
Ohi
Rail transportation in Ohio